Formotosena seebohmi is a cicada species from Taiwan,China, Vietnam and Japan.

References

Insects described in 1904
Insects of China
Polyneurini